Li Won-ho (born 5 August 1972) is a North Korean short track speed skater. He competed in the men's 1000 metres event at the 1992 Winter Olympics.

References

1972 births
Living people
North Korean male short track speed skaters
Olympic short track speed skaters of North Korea
Short track speed skaters at the 1992 Winter Olympics
Place of birth missing (living people)
20th-century North Korean people
Medalists at the 1990 Asian Winter Games
Short track speed skaters at the 1990 Asian Winter Games
Asian Games medalists in short track speed skating
Asian Games silver medalists for North Korea